Amenia leonina is a blowfly in the family Calliphoridae, found in Australia.

References

Calliphoridae
Insects described in 1775
Taxa named by Johan Christian Fabricius